Hugh Carpenter Bedient (October 23, 1889 – July 21, 1965) was a starting pitcher who played in the American League for the Boston Red Sox (1912–1914) and with the Buffalo Blues of the Federal League (1915). Bedient batted and threw right-handed.

Baseball career

Semi-pro
Pitching for a semi-professional team based in Falconer, New York, on July 25, 1908, Bedient struck out 42 batters in a 23-inning, 3–1 victory against a team from Corry, Pennsylvania. Two days later, the  Jamestown Evening Journal ran the headline: "Broke all records. Bedient of Falconer struck out 42 men", and the Corry Journal stated, "Corry and Falconer make World's record.".

Professional
Bedient was selected by Boston Red Sox from Fall River (New England League) in the major league draft on September 1, 1910. He made his major league debut in 1912. He won 20 games as a Red Sox rookie and outdueled legend Christy Mathewson, defeating the New York Giants, 2–1, in Game Five of the 1912 World Series. He also pitched the first seven innings of the final game, won by the Red Sox in the tenth, 3–2.

His hometown honored his return in October, 1912 with a parade and celebration.

In three seasons with the Red Sox, Bedient had a mark of 44 wins and 35 losses with 314 strikeouts and a 3.05 earned run average in  innings pitched. He later became a member of the outlaw Federal League. Pitching for the Buffalo Blues, he went 16–18 with 106 strikeouts and a 3.12 ERA in  innings, leading the league with 10 saves.

During the 1915 season, Bedient pitched for the Buffalo Blues of the outlaw major league called the Federal League.

Minor league

Bedient played a significant time in the minor leagues, as follows:

 1910 - Fall River (New England League)
 1911 - Providence (Eastern League)
 1916 - 1917 and 1921 - 1923 - Toledo (American Association)
 1924 - Portland (Pacific Coast League)
 1925 - Atlanta (Southern Association)

Later life

After leaving baseball, Bedient owned a farm in Levant, a hamlet of Jamestown, New York.  He was buried at Levant Cemetery in Poland, Chautauqua County, New York.

Memorial

A memorial marker is located a Falconer New York, in the Falconer Park baseball field on Mosher Street, where Bedient once played.

See also
List of Major League Baseball annual saves leaders

References

External links

Baseball Almanac
Retrosheet

Boston Red Sox players
Buffalo Blues players
Major League Baseball pitchers
Baseball players from New York (state)
1889 births
1965 deaths
Fall River Indians players
Providence Grays (minor league) players
Toledo Iron Men players
Portland Beavers players
Atlanta Crackers players
People from Chautauqua County, New York